Mariana Diaz Ximenez, (born December 13, 1983 in Baucau), is an East Timorese athlete who specialises in the marathon.

A resident of Dili, she fled her home in 1999 after East Timor's declaration of independence from Indonesia, and the ensuing violence. When she returned to the capital, she "saw the Dili harbor filled with the bloated bodies of the dead".

In 2001, Diaz won a gold medal in the marathon at the Arafura Games in Australia. In 2002, she represented the newly independent country at the Asian Games in Busan, where she ran the marathon.

Having attempted unsuccessfully to qualify for the 2004 Summer Olympics in Athens, Diaz was one of the two representatives of Timor-Leste at the 2008 Olympic Games in Beijing. However, she did not finish the race.

References

External links
 

1983 births
Living people
People from Baucau District
East Timorese female long-distance runners
Athletes (track and field) at the 2008 Summer Olympics
Olympic athletes of East Timor
East Timorese female marathon runners
Athletes (track and field) at the 2002 Asian Games
Asian Games competitors for East Timor